Athanasios Dimitrakopoulos (14 May 1936 – 8 July 2022) was a Greek lawyer and politician who served in the Hellenic Parliament from 1981 until 1996, representing  as a member of the Panhellenic Socialist Movement.

Dimitrakopoulos was born in the town of Platanos, Aetolia-Acarnania in the Kingdom of Greece. He studied law in Athens. Dimitrakopoulos was first elected to the Hellenic Parliament in the 1981 Greek legislative election, and he was re-elected in 1985, June 1989, November 1989, 1990, and 1993. From September 1987 until June 1988, Dimitrakopoulos was a deputy minister in Parliament. He later served as the president of the Hellenic Post.

Dimitrakopoulos was married and had two children. He died on 8 July 2022, at the age of 86.

Notes

References 

1936 births
2022 deaths
Place of death missing
Greek MPs 1981–1985
Greek MPs 1985–1989
Greek MPs 1989 (June–November)
Greek MPs 1989–1990
Greek MPs 1990–1993
Greek MPs 1993–1996
Government ministers of Greece
PASOK politicians
People from Nafpaktia